Zenon  may refer to

 Zenon, an Ancient Greek name, derived from the theonym Zeus

Industry 
 ZENON Environmental, a Canadian water treatment company based in Oakville, Ontario
 Zenon Petroleum and Gas, importer of fuel products

Fiction  

 Zenon: Girl of the 21st Century (film) 
 Zenon: The Zequel , a 2001 Disney Channel Original Movie directed by Manny Coto
 Zenon: Z3 television film trilogy, following Zenon: Girl of the 21st Century (1999) and Zenon: The Zequel (2001)
 Monthly Comic Zenon, a Japanese manga anthology
 Zenon: Girl of the 21st Century, a 1997 children's science fiction picture book written by Marilyn Sadler and illustrated by Roger Bollen

Fictional characters

 Great Demon King Zenon, leader of the demons in the manga and anime Devilman
 Overlord Zenon, antagonist from the video game Disgaea 2: Cursed Memories
 Zenon Kar, character in the film Zenon: Girl of the 21st Century
 Zénon Ligre, alchemist, the protagonist of Marguerite Yourcenar's novel The Abyss
 Zenon Zogratis, antagonist and human host of a demon, of the manga  Black Clover
 Zenón Barriga y Pesado, character in the Mexican sitcom El Chavo del Ocho

Given name

 Zenon of Kaunos, son of Agreophon, was a public official in Ptolemaic Egypt around the 240s-220s BC
 Zénon Bacq, a Belgian radiobiologist and inventor
 Zenon Caravella (born 1983), Australian footballer
 Zenon Grocholewski (born 1939), Polish cardinal
 Zenon Jankowski, a retired Polish pilot, colonel of the Polish Army and cosmonaut. Jankowski was selected
 Zenon Jaskuła (born 1962), Polish cyclist
 Zenon Konopka (born 1981), Canadian/Polish hockey player
 Zenon B. Lukosius (1918–2006), American World War II veteran
 Zenon Mikhailidis, Greek shooter
 Zenon Pylyshyn (born 1937), Canadian cognitive scientist
 Zenon (footballer) (born 1954), Brazilian footballer
 Zénon Trudeau (1748–1813), French colonial administrator

Surname

 Golden J. Zenon Jr. (1929–2006), African-American architect 
 Kevin Zenon, an Argentine professional footballer
 Miguel Zenón, a Puerto Rican alto saxophonist, composer, band leader, music producer, and educator
 Paul Zenon (born 1964), English street magician

Others 

 Zenon or Cyclone Numa, 2017 Mediterranean tropical-like cyclone

See also
 Zeno (disambiguation)
 Zenone (disambiguation)
 Zenon (disambiguation)